Epeli is a Fijian male given name. Notable people with this name include:

 Epeli Baleibau (born 1972), Fijian athlete
 Epeli Ganilau (born 1951), Fijian military officer and politician
 Epeli Hauʻofa (1939–2009), Tongan and Fijian writer and anthropologist
 Epeli Kanakana (died 2010), Fijian chief
 Epeli Lairoti (born 1995), Fijian football player 
 Epeli Loaniceva (born 1992), Fijian football player
 Epeli Nailatikau (born 1941), Fijian chief
 Epeli Nailatikau I (1842–1901), Fijian Paramount Chief
 Epeli Naituivau (born 1962), Fijian rugby union player
 Epeli Niudamu, Fijian Chief, soldier, and political leader
 Epeli Qaraninamu Nailatikau (born 1942), Fijian medical doctor and political leader
 Epeli Rabua Rabua (born 1998), Fijian swimmer
 Epeli Rakai Rakai (born 1961), Fijian rugby union player
 Epeli Ruivadra Ruivadra (born 1977), Fijian rugby union player
 Epeli Saukuru (born 1988), Fijian football player